The 2017–18 Florida State Seminoles men's basketball team represented Florida State University during the 2017–18 NCAA Division I men's basketball season. The Seminoles were led by head coach Leonard Hamilton, in his 16th year, and played their home games at the Donald L. Tucker Center on the university's Tallahassee, Florida campus as members of the Atlantic Coast Conference.

Florida State finished the season 23–12, 9–9 in ACC play, to finish in a tie for eighth place. The Seminoles lost in the second round of the ACC tournament to Louisville. They received an at-large bid to the NCAA tournament where they defeated Missouri in the first round, upset Xavier and Gonzaga before losing to Michigan.

Previous season
The Seminoles finished the 2016–17 season with a record of 26–9, 12–6 in ACC play, to finish in a three-way tie for second place. They defeated Virginia Tech in the ACC tournament before losing to Notre Dame in the quarterfinals. They received an at-large bid to the NCAA tournament as the #3 seed in the West Region. There, they defeated #14 Florida Gulf Coast in the First Round before being upset by #11 Xavier in the Second Round.

Offseason

Departures

2017 recruiting class

2018 recruiting class

Roster

Schedule

|-
!colspan=12 style=|Jamaican Foreign Tour

|-
!colspan=12 style=|Exhibition

|-
!colspan=12 style=|Non-conference regular season

|-
!colspan=12 style=|ACC regular season

|-
!colspan=12 style=| ACC Tournament

|-
!colspan=12 style=| NCAA tournament

Awards

Watchlists
 Jerry West Award
M.J. Walker

Rankings

^Coaches did not release a Week 2 poll
*AP does not release post-NCAA Tournament rankings

References

External links
 Official Team Website

Florida State
Florida State Seminoles men's basketball seasons
Florida State
Florida State Seminoles men's basketball
Florida State Seminoles men's basketball